Tactical unit may refer to:

 Police tactical unit, a specialist police unit that manages and resolves high risk incidents including terrorism. 
 Tactical Unit (film series), a series of Hong Kong films